Walter Clarence Thurston (1894–1974) was an American diplomat who served in Mexico, Guatemala, Nicaragua, the United Kingdom, Costa Rica, Brazil, Paraguay, Switzerland, Spain, Portugal, and the Soviet Union, Costa Rica. He also served as ambassador to El Salvador, Bolivia and Mexico.

References

1894 births
1974 deaths
Ambassadors of the United States to Costa Rica
Ambassadors of the United States to Mexico
Ambassadors of the United States to El Salvador
Ambassadors of the United States to Bolivia